The CE-20 is a cryogenic rocket engine developed by the Liquid Propulsion Systems Centre, a subsidiary of Indian Space Research Organisation. It has been developed to power the upper stage of the LVM 3. It is the first Indian cryogenic engine to feature a gas-generator cycle. The high thrust cryogenic engine is the most powerful upper stage cryogenic engine in operational service.

Overview
The CE-20 is the first Indian cryogenic engine to feature a gas-generator cycle. The engine produces a nominal thrust of 200 kN, but has an operating thrust range between 180 kN to 220 kN and can be set to any fixed values between them. The combustion chamber burns liquid hydrogen and liquid oxygen at 6 MPa with 5.05 engine mixture ratio.

Development and Testing

 On 28 April 2015, CE-20 cleared a 635 seconds long duration hot test at IPRC, Mahendragiri test facility. This test was preceded by two cold start tests and four short duration hot tests.
 On 16 July 2015, the first developmental CE-20 engine 'E1' was successfully endurance hot tested  at ISRO Propulsion Complex, Mahendragiri for a duration of 800 seconds with Mixture Ratio Controller (MRC) in closed loop mode. This duration is approximately 25% more than the engine burn duration in flight. This was tenth development test for CE-20 
 On 10 August 2015, a short duration (5.7 seconds) hot test on the CE20 engine was done to demonstrate the successful engine ignition with tank pressure conditions as in flight.
 On 19 February 2016, the second developmental CE-20 engine 'E2' was hot-tested for a duration of 640 seconds with Mixture Ratio Controller (MRC) in closed loop mode at ISRO Propulsion Complex, Mahendragiri.
 On 03 December 2016, flight acceptance test of 25 seconds in high altitude conditions was carried out on third developmental CE-20 engine (E3). It was successfully flown on the first developmental flight 'D1' of the GSLV Mk-III on 5 June 2017.
On 25 January 2017, CE-20 engine E2 integrated with development stage for GSLV Mk III, C25 'D' was tested for duration of 50 seconds.
On 17 February 2017, CE-20 engine E2 integrated with development stage for GSLV Mk III, C25 'D' was tested for duration of 640 seconds.
On 11 October 2018, CE-20 engine E6 completed 25 second long flight acceptance test in high altitude conditions for GSLV Mk III M1/Chandrayaan-2 mission
On 16 December 2021, CE20 (E9 engine) was tested to demonstrate the repeatability of engine ignition with stable combustion. Two ignition trial tests of 3.2 seconds duration were conducted nominally followed by a nominal hot test of 50 seconds duration.
On 12 January 2022, CE-20 engine E9 completed 720 second long qualification test for Gaganyaan programme.
On 29 October 2022, CE-20 engine E11 completed flight acceptance hot test for 25 seconds. Test was conducted to check the integrity of hardware, subsystems' performance and tuning the engine for LVM 3 M3 mission.
On 9 November 2022, CE-20 engine E9 was hot tested for 70 seconds. During this test the engine operated at thrust level of  approximately 20 tonnes for the first 40 seconds and then switched to an uprated thrust regime of 21.8 tonnes lasting ~30 seconds. This uprated engine would increase payload capacity of LVM3 to GTO by up to 450 kg along an appropriate stage with additional propellant loading. As part of engine modification, Thrust Control Valve (TCV), 3D-printed LOX and LH2 turbine, and exhaust casings were introduced for the first time.
On 23 December 2022, CE-20 engine E9 was hot tested for 650 second duration. For the first 40 seconds of test, the engine was operated at 20.2 tonne thrust level, after this engine was operated at 20 tonne off-nominal zones and then for 435 seconds it was operated at 22.2 tonne thrust level. With this test, the 'E9' engine has been qualified for induction in flight. The E9 engine with this hot test has undergone twelve hot tests with 3370 seconds cumulative burn duration at different thrust & mixture ratio levels.
On 27 February 2023, ISRO conducted successful Hot Test of CE-20 engine for 25 seconds at High Altitude Test Facility. CE-20 will now be combined with propellant tanks, stage structures and related fluid lines to produce an integrated flight cryogenic stage. The test was part of Chandrayaan-3 mission.

See also
 
 CE-7.5
 LVM 3
 GSAT-14

References

External links

 India test-fires indigenous cryo engine for 800 seconds
 LPSC handouts during Aero India-2009 with Ce-20 specifications
 LPSC handouts during Aero India-2009 with specifications of all Liquid-fueled engines of India
 Status of CE-20 in Space Transportation/GSLV - Mk III of ISRO's 2008-09 Annual Report
 ISRO upbeat as indigenous cryo engine passes test  

Rocket engines of India
Rocket engines using hydrogen propellant
Rocket engines using the gas-generator cycle